Skyronnes are Icelandic dipping sauces made out of skyr instead of mayonnaise.

They are usually served with fish and chips.

References

Icelandic cuisine
Sauces